Katrin Budde (born 13 April 1965) is a German politician of the Social Democratic Party (SPD) who has been serving as a member of the Bundestag from the state of Saxony-Anhalt since 2017.

Early life and career 
After graduating from high school in 1983, Budde started an internship at the former VEB Schwermaschinenbau Karl Liebknecht in Magdeburg. From 1984 to 1989, she studied at the Technical University Magdeburg (from 1987 Technical University), where she graduated as an engineer for work design. Subsequently, she worked as a research assistant at VEB FER (research, development, rationalisation) until 1990.

Political career

Career in state politics
From 1990 to 2017 Budde was a member of the State Parliament of Saxony-Anhalt. From 2009 to 2016, she also served as chairwoman of the SPD in Saxony-Anhalt; she resigned from that position following the party's defeat in the 2016 state elections.

Budde co-chaired the SPD’s national conventions in Berlin (2011) Hanover (2012) and Augsburg (2013).

Member of the German Parliament, 2017–present
Budde became a member of the Bundestag in the 2017 German federal election, representing the Mansfeld district. She has been the chairwoman of the Committee on Cultural Affairs and Media and a member of the Defense Committee. In addition to her committee assignments, she has been serving as deputy chairwoman of the German-Swiss Parliamentary Friendship Group.

Ahead of the 2021 elections, the SPD’s leadership in Saxony-Anhalt selected Budde to lead the party’s campaign; at a party convention, however, Karamba Diaby was elected to spearhead the campaign, with Budde only coming second. 

Within the SPD parliamentary group, Budde belonged to the Parliamentary Left, a left-wing movement, before moving to the Seeheim Circle in 2022.

Other activities
 Stiftung Archiv der Parteien und Massenorganisationen der DDR (SAPMO), Member of the Board of Trustees (since 2022)
 German Historical Museum (DHM), Alternate Member of the Board of Trustees (since 2020)
 German National Committee for Monument Preservation (DNK), Member of the Board (since 2020)
 Memorial to the Murdered Jews of Europe Foundation, Member of the Board of Trustees (since 2020)
 Federal Foundation for the Reappraisal of the SED Dictatorship, Member of the Board of Trustees

References

External links 

  
 Bundestag biography 

1965 births
Living people
Members of the Bundestag for Saxony-Anhalt
Female members of the Bundestag
21st-century German women politicians
Members of the Bundestag 2017–2021
Members of the Bundestag 2021–2025
Members of the Bundestag for the Social Democratic Party of Germany